The Jordan Brand Classic is a high school All-Star basketball game played annually in April. The game's rosters feature the best and most highly recruited high school boys in the senior class including alumns like Chris Paul, Carmelo Anthony, Blake Griffin, Kyrie Irving, LeBron James, Kevin Durant, Anthony Davis, Jayson Tatum, and Zion Williamson.

The game takes its name from the chief organizer, Jordan Brand, a division of Nike named after Michael Jordan. The 22 players are routinely selected from the top 100 players as ranked by numerous scouting services.

History

2013
Julius Randle (Dallas, TX/Kentucky) earned co-Most Valuable Player honors as he finished with 19 points and seven rebounds at the 12th annual Jordan Brand Classic. Sharing the co-MVP honors was Jabari Parker (Chicago, IL/Duke), who had 16 points and seven rebounds. The Jordan Brand Classic not only features future stars on the court, but many prominent celebrities such as Michael Jordan, Mark Wahlberg, CC Sabathia, Carmelo Anthony, Amar'e Stoudemire, Fabolous and J. R. Smith were in attendance. In addition to the post-game performance by Drake, the X-Factor Drumline wowed fans during the International Game halftime and Saxophonist Mike Phillips and violinist Lee England, Jr. performed together during the National Game halftime show. Other standouts in the game included Nigel Williams-Goss (Henderson, NV/Washington), who had 17 points for the West team and Andrew Wiggins (Huntington, VA/Kansas) who had 19 points for the East. The event concluded a week of activities around Brooklyn and New York City, including a special movie screening with director Spike Lee at the Brooklyn Academy of Music, an awards dinner at ThreeSixity and a tour of the Gleason's Boxing Gym with Team Jordan athlete Andre Ward.

2012
Shabazz Muhammad (UCLA) earned co-Most Valuable Player honors tonight as he showcased his talents on the National stage, leading the West All-Americans with 20 points and four rebounds. Muhammad was joined by co-MVP Rodney Purvis (UCONN) who shined in his home state of North Carolina leading the East All-Americans with 22 points and three steals. Other statistical standouts included Alex Poythress (Kentucky) with 16 points, Archie Goodwin (Kentucky) with 14 points and four assists, Kaleb Tarczewski (Arizona) with 14 points and 10 rebounds and Tony Parker (UCLA) with 12 rebounds. Sponsored by Jordan Brand, a division of NIKE, Inc., the event was once again attended by some of sport and entertainment's celebrities, including a post game performance by rapper Fabolous. The North Carolina A&T University marching band was featured at halftime and violinist Lee England Jr. performed the National Anthem.

2011
Kentucky-bound Anthony Davis earned co-Most Valuable Player honors tonight, as he finished with 29 points and 11 rebounds and 4 blocks for the West All-Americans who lost to the East All-Americans 113–109 at the 10th anniversary Jordan Brand Classic presented by Foot Locker. Davis was joined by co-MVP James Michael McAdoo (UNC) who had 26 points, 14 rebounds for the East All-Americans. Other statistical standouts in the game included Austin Rivers (Duke) with 16 points, Tony Wroten (Washington) with 10 assists, Bradley Beal (Florida) with 8 rebounds and Khem Birch (Pittsburgh) with 5 blocks. Sponsored by Jordan Brand, a division of NIKE, Inc., the event was attended by celebrities, including North Carolina native J. Cole headlining the post-game performance. In addition, beat maker AraabMuzik was featured at halftime and singer Anthony Hamilton performed the National Anthem.

2010

North Carolina-bound Harrison Barnes earned co-Most Valuable Player honors as he finished with 20 points and 15 rebounds to lead the White Jerseys to the 129–125 victory over the Black Jerseys at the 2010 Jordan Brand Classic at Madison Square Garden in New York City. Harrison Barnes was joined by co-MVP Kyrie Irving (Duke) who had 22 points, seven assists and four rebounds for the Black Jerseys. Other statistical standouts included Josh Selby (Kansas) with 21 points, Cory Joseph (Texas) with seven assists, Tristan Thompson (Texas) with 13 rebounds and Jared Sullinger (Ohio State) with four blocks. A highlight of the evening was college announcements in front of the Madison Square Garden crowd and national ESPN television audience from Josh Selby, who committed to Kansas and New York City native Doron Lamb, who announced that he will be attending Kentucky in the fall. The Jordan Brand Classic saw the participation of various musicians and sports personalities including Chris Paul, Jadakiss, DJ Clue, Mario, MC Lyte,
Lee England, DJ Clark Kent, Skyzoo and Alex Thomas. Multi-platinum recording artist and actor Common headlined the halftime musical performance while R&B artist and songwriter Marsha Ambrosius performed the National Anthem.

2009
Georgia Tech-bound Derrick Favors earned co-Most Valuable Player honors as he finished with 21 points and five rebounds to lead the Black Jerseys to the 110–103 victory over the White Jerseys. Favors was joined by co-MVP Renardo Sidney (Mississippi State) who had 15 points, seven rebounds and two blocks. Other statistical standouts included Wally Judge (Kansas State) with 18 points, John Wall (Kentucky) with six assists, Daniel Orton (Kentucky) with nine rebounds and John Henson (North Carolina) with four blocks. Michael Jordan, CC Sabathia, Spike Lee, Fat Joe, Vince Carter and Kevin Durant attended the game, among others. Grammy nominee recording artist Akon, performed during halftime of the All-American game.

2008
Brandon Jennings (Italy) earned co-Most Valuable Player honors tonight as he finished with 10 points and 14 assists to lead the Blue Jerseys to the 124–114 victory over the White Jerseys in the 2008 Jordan Brand Classic. Jennings was joined by co-MVP Tyreke Evans (Memphis) who had 23 points, seven rebounds and four assists. Jennings’ 14 assists broke the event record previously held by Corey Fisher while his teammates Scotty Hopson (Tennessee) and DeMar DeRozan (USC) contributed 21 and 17 points respectively. The White Jerseys saw solid contributions from Devin Ebanks (West Virginia), who had 20 points and four rebounds and Samardo Samuels (Louisville) who tallied 16 points and five boards. The game saw the attendance of various celebrities, among which Vince Carter, Rudy Gay, Kevin Durant, Ron Harper, Mýa and Michael Jordan. Boyz II Men opened the event singing the national anthem.

2007
Corey Fisher (Villanova) tallied 10 assists to set a new record for the Jordan Brand All-American Classic, presented by Foot Locker and Boost Mobile, as he led his Yellow Jerseys to the 127–119 victory at Madison Square Garden. The Yellow Jerseys also got contributions from Eric Gordon (Indiana), Kyle Singler (Duke) and Austin Freeman (Georgetown) who each had 16 points a piece. Jeff Robinson (Memphis) led the Yellow Jerseys with 17 points.  Donté Greene (Syracuse), who also won the dunk contest earlier in the week, led the Royal Jerseys with 20 points to share the MVP award with Fisher.  The Royal Jerseys had solid performances from Patrick Patterson (Kentucky) who recorded 12 points and 12 rebounds along with Jerryd Bayless who poured in 17 points and dished out three assists. This year's event was the first high school all-star game to be televised in High Definition, with a live national broadcast on ESPN2.

2006
For the second consecutive year the Jordan Classic was played in New York City at the Madison Square Garden. 10,000 plus people were in attendance. Georgia Tech-bound Thaddeus Young earned co-Most Valuable Player honors as he finished with 28 points and 13 rebounds to lead the White Jerseys to the 108–95 victory over the Black Jerseys. Young was joined by co-MVP Kevin Durant (Texas) who had 16 points, seven rebounds and three blocks. The event was attended by Michael Jordan, LL Cool J, Warren Sapp, Floyd Mayweather, Ahmad Rashad, Al Harrington, Rudy Gay, Fabolous, and Vince Carter.  Atlanta-based rapper T.I., who starred in the movie ‘ATL’ and had the No.1 album ‘King’, performed prior to the All-American game. Young helped the White Jerseys take a seven-point first-half lead in a game that was close from the start. His 28 points was the second-highest all-time scoring total behind 34 points from LeBron James in 2003 and Young's 13 rebounds were the fourth-highest mark in game history as well. Another standout performer for the White Jerseys was Sherron Collins (Kansas) with 14 points and six assists. For the Black Jerseys, Durant was joined by the Syracuse recruit tandem of Paul Harris and Mike Jones who each chipped in 16 points. Brandan Wright (North Carolina), Wayne Ellington (North Carolina), Edgar Sosa (Louisville) and DeShawn Sims (Michigan) also each finished in double-figures.

2005
A new home was chosen for the Jordan All-American Classic as the event took center stage at Madison Square Garden in New York City before a crowd that included the likes of Michael Jordan, Spike Lee, Terrell Owens, Vince Carter and a special performance by Fat Joe. In the last year before the NBA restricted players from leaving directly for the NBA, a quarter of the 2005 Jordan All-Americans went from this game directly to the professional ranks. One of those NBA draft picks, Andray Blatche (Washington Wizards), finished off his high school career with a Co-MVP performance of 26 points on 12–17 shooting with 16 rebounds to lead the White Jerseys. Sharing the award was Tyler Hansbrough (North Carolina) who helped his Gray Jerseys to a last-minute 127–126 win with 24 points and nine rebounds. Joining Blatche making the leap to the NBA included C.J. Miles (Utah Jazz), Louis Williams (Philadelphia 76ers), Andrew Bynum (LA Lakers), and Martell Webster (Portland Trail Blazers).

2004
The Black Jerseys won with the contribution of the year's No. 1 NBA Draft pick as they defeated the White Jerseys by a score of 107–96 at the Comcast Center on the campus of the University of Maryland. The Black Jerseys, which took the lead at the beginning of the game and never looked back, were led by Dwight Howard (Los Angeles Lakers) of Southwest Atlanta Christian Academy. He was voted the game's MVP with 18 points, 15 rebounds and six blocks. Dorell Wright (Miami Heat) had 24 points and seven rebounds for the White Jerseys in a losing cause.  Complementing Howard's dominating performance were Malik Hairston (San Antonio Spurs) who chipped in 23 points and Robert Vaden (Indiana) who added 21 points to lead the Black Jerseys to the win.  Al Jefferson (Charlotte Hornets) had 17 points and 10 rebounds and Rajon Rondo (Chicago Bulls) scored 12 points and recorded five assists in the losing effort for the White Jerseys. The Class of 2004 included a number of others who starred during the 2006 NCAA season including National Champion Corey Brewer (Florida), Jordan Farmar (UCLA), Daniel Gibson (Texas), LaMarcus Aldridge (Texas) and Rudy Gay (Connecticut).

2003
The 2003 Jordan All-American Classic was played in front of a sold-out crowd of 18,424 fans at the MCI Center in Washington, DC. The game gave a glimpse at many future NBA players from the start, but the second half belonged to Co-MVP Shannon Brown (Los Angeles Lakers) as he led the Silver Jerseys with 27 points and eight assists.  His teammate Chris Paul (Los Angeles Clippers) added 18 points and five assists to go along with a solid defensive effort. Co-MVP LeBron James (Cleveland Cavaliers) finished the game with 34 points and 12 rebounds for the Black Jerseys. Linas Kleiza (Europe) scored 16 points and had 10 rebounds and Kris Humphries (Boston Celtics) contributed 12 points and 12 rebounds to pace the Black Jerseys. The Silver Jerseys outscored their opponents by nine in the second half to prevail 107–102. The event also included musical performances by Bow Wow and Ludacris.

2002
The 2002 Jordan All-American Classic was played at Washington, D.C.'s MCI Center with many players who went on to play in the NBA. The White Jerseys, led by coach Steve Smith of Oak Hill Academy, had Co-MVP's Sean May (Sacramento Kings) and Amar'e Stoudemire (Phoenix Suns) contribute 49 points and 27 rebounds to their victory. In fact, nine of the 12 White Team players scored in double-figures, including Rashad McCants (Minnesota Timberwolves) who went 10-13 from the field for 23 points. For the Red Team, fans saw former Oak Hill teammates Carmelo Anthony (New York Knicks) and Justin Gray (Wake Forest) score 27 and 17 points respectively. Over the next four years, this class would include representation on three National Champions (Anthony, McCants, May and Denham Brown) and numerous NBA lottery picks.

Game results

Alumni
Click Here for a complete listing of Jordan Brand Classic alumni up to 2014.

Year-by-year rosters

2002

RED
Hassan Adams
Carmelo Anthony
Kelenna Azubuike
Dee Brown
Greg Brunner
Justin Gray
Alexander Johnson
Jimmy McKinney
Shavlik Randolph
JJ Redick
Chris Rodgers
Aaron Spears
Bracey Wright

WHITE
Denham Brown
Evan Burns
Travis Garrison
John Gilchrist
Jeff Horner
Andre Iguodala 
Jarrett Jack
Sean May
Rashad McCants
Amar'e Stoudemire
Michael Thompson 
Kennedy Winston

2003

BLACK
Shagari Alleyne
Gary Ervin
Brandon Foust 
Kris Humphries
LeBron James
Linas Kleiza
Drew Lavender 
Rodrick Stewart
Von Wafer

SILVER
Shannon Brown
Jermareo Davidson
Ndudi Ebi
J. R. Giddens
Dion Harris
Ekene Ibekwe
Taurean "Tack" Minor 
Chris Paul
Courtney Sims

2004

BLACK
Ra'Sean Dickey
Jordan Farmar
Daniel Gibson
Malik Hairston
Dwight Howard
Brian Johnson
Russell Robinson
Isaiah Swann
Robert Vaden
D. J. White

WHITE
LaMarcus Aldridge
Corey Brewer
Joe Crawford
Rudy Gay
Al Jefferson
Sasha Kaun
A. J. Price
Jason Rich
Rajon Rondo
Dorell Wright

2005

GRAY
Andrew Bynum
Devan Downey
Levance Fields
Tyler Hansbrough
C. J. Miles
Kevin Rogers 
Magnum Rolle
Lou Williams
Shawne Williams
Julian Wright

WHITE
Andray Blatche
Eric Boateng
Jon Brockman
Keith Brumbaugh
Lewis Clinch
Micah Downs
Richard Hendrix
Emanuel "Tiki" Mayben
Mike Mercer
Martell Webster

2006

BLACK
Demond Carter
Kevin Durant
Paul Harris
Mike Jones
Ty Lawson
Vernon Macklin
Obi Muonelo
Greg Oden
DaJuan Summers
Brandan Wright
Brian Zoubek

WHITE
Sherron Collins
Duke Crews
Wayne Ellington
Spencer Hawes
Curtis Kelly
Jon Kreft
Jon Scheyer
DeShawn Sims
Edgar Sosa
Thaddeus Young

2007

ROYAL
Jerryd Bayless
Donté Greene
Jeffrey Jordan
Kosta Koufos
Kalin Lucas
O. J. Mayo
Patrick Patterson
Chandler Parsons
Durrell Summers
Chris Wright (b. 1989)

YELLOW
Corey Fisher
Austin Freeman
Eric Gordon
Blake Griffin
Gary Johnson
Jai Lucas
Jeff Robinson
Derrick Rose
Kyle Singler
Chris Wright (b. 1988)

2008

AWAY
William Buford
DeMar DeRozan
Drew Gordon
JaMychal Green
Jrue Holiday
Scotty Hopson
Brandon Jennings
Malcolm Lee
Greg Monroe
B. J. Mullens
Wesley Witherspoon

HOME
Al-Farouq Aminu
Ed Davis
Michael Dunigan
Devin Ebanks
Tyreke Evans
Delvon Roe
Samardo Samuels
Iman Shumpert
Kemba Walker
Willie Warren
Tony Woods

2009

BLACK
Kenny Boynton
Avery Bradley
Dominic Cheek
DeMarcus Cousins
Derrick Favors
Abdul Gaddy
Jordan Hamilton
John Henson
Lamont Jones
Alex Oriakhi
Durand Scott

WHITE
Tiny Gallon
Xavier Henry
Marcus Jordan
Wally Judge
Tommy Mason-Griffin
Daniel Orton
Renardo Sidney
John Wall
Royce White
Jamil Wilson
Mouphtaou Yarou

2010

BLUE
Harrison Barnes
Will Barton
Tobias Harris
Terrence Jones
Cory Joseph
Doron Lamb
Kendall Marshall
Josh Selby
Joshua Smith
Tristan Thompson

RED
Reggie Bullock
Kyrie Irving
Perry Jones
Jelan Kendrick
Brandon Knight
C. J. Leslie
Roscoe Smith
Jared Sullinger
Deshaun Thomas
Dion Waiters

2011

BLACK
Bradley Beal
Jabari Brown
Kentavious Caldwell-Pope
Anthony Davis
Myck Kabongo
Johnny O'Bryant
Sir'Dominic Pointer
Otto Porter
Adonis Thomas
Kyle Wiltjer
Tony Wroten

WHITE
Khem Birch
Michael Carter-Williams
Rakeem Christmas
Michael Gbinije
Michael Gilchrist
P. J. Hairston
James Michael McAdoo
Austin Rivers
Shannon Scott
Marquis Teague

2012

EAST
Kyle Anderson
Kris Dunn
Jerami Grant
Gary Harris
Brice Johnson
Ricky Ledo
Nerlens Noel
Tony Parker
Rodney Purvis
Kaleb Tarczewski
JP Tokoto

WEST
Steven Adams
Brandon Ashley
Isaiah Austin
Anthony Bennett
Archie Goodwin
Danuel House
Grant Jerrett
Shabazz Muhammad
Marcus Paige
Alex Poythress
Rasheed Sulaimon

2013

EAST
Tyler Ennis
Aaron Harrison
Andrew Harrison
Kuran Iverson
Rondae Jefferson
Kennedy Meeks
Bobby Portis
Julius Randle
Wayne Selden
Chris Walker
Andrew Wiggins

WEST
Joel Embiid
Aaron Gordon
Kasey Hill
Dakari Johnson
Matt Jones
Marcus Lee
Jabari Parker
Noah Vonleh
Troy Williams
Nigel Williams-Goss
James Young

2014

EAST
Grayson Allen
Joel Berry II
James Blackmon Jr.
Justin Jackson
Tyus Jones
Trey Lyles
Jahlil Okafor
Kelly Oubre
L. J. Peak
Karl-Anthony Towns
Reid Travis
Rashad Vaughn
Isaiah Whitehead

WEST
Shaqquan Aaron
Cliff Alexander
Devin Booker
Kameron Chatman
Daniel Hamilton
Stanley Johnson
Chris McCullough
Emmanuel Mudiay
Theo Pinson
D'Angelo Russell
Myles Turner
Tyler Ulis
Justise Winslow

2015
Source

EAST
Isaiah Briscoe
Jaylen Brown
Jalen Brunson
Thomas Bryant
Jalen Coleman
Eric Davis
Cheick Diallo
Henry Ellenson
Luke Kennard
Skal Labissière
Charles Matthews
Malachi Richardson
Caleb Swanigan

WEST
Dwayne Bacon
Malik Beasley
Antonio Blakeney
Deyonta Davis
Tyler Davis
Tyler Dorsey
Austin Grandstaff
Dedric Lawson
Malik Newman
Ivan Rabb
Ben Simmons
Allonzo Trier
Stephen Zimmerman

2016
Source

EAST
Bam Adebayo
Udoka Azubuike
Tony Bradley
Bruce Brown Jr.
De'Aaron Fox
Markelle Fultz 
Harry Giles
Alterique Gilbert
Jonathan Isaac
V. J. King
Jayson Tatum

WEST
Miles Bridges
Marques Bolden
Amir Coffey
Wenyen Gabriel
Frank Jackson
Andrew Jones
Malik Monk
Shamorie Ponds
Omari Spellman
Cassius Winston

2017
Source

EAST
Brian Bowen
Wendell Carter Jr.
Trevon Duval
Jalek Felton
Quade Green
Jaren Jackson Jr.
Brandon McCoy
John Petty Jr.
Michael Porter Jr.
Mitchell Robinson
Jarred Vanderbilt
Tremont Waters

WEST
Deandre Ayton
Mo Bamba
Troy Brown Jr.
Matt Coleman III
Kevin Knox
Billy Preston
Collin Sexton
Nick Richards
Gary Trent Jr.
P. J. Washington
Lonnie Walker
Trae Young

2018
Source

EAST
RJ Barrett
Jalen Carey
Ayo Dosunmu
Quentin Grimes
Tre Jones
Romeo Langford
Andrew Nembhard
Cam Reddish
Anfernee Simons
Jalen Smith
Cole Swider
Emmitt Williams
Zion Williamson

WEST
Darius Bazley
Bol Bol
Darius Garland
Tyler Herro
Jaylen Hoard
Keldon Johnson
Louis King
Nassir Little
Shareef O'Neal
Will Richardson
Simisola Shittu
Javonte Smart
Coby White

2019
Source

BLACK
Cole Anthony
Armando Bacot
Vernon Carey Jr.
Anthony Edwards
Boogie Ellis
Alonzo Gaffney
Trayce Jackson-Davis
Wendell Moore Jr.
Jahmi'us Ramsey
C. J. Walker
Rocket Watts
Romeo Weems
Patrick Williams

WHITE
Keion Brooks Jr.
D. J. Jeffries
Jalen Lecque
Tre Mann
Nico Mannion
Tyrese Maxey
Jaden McDaniels
Cassius Stanley
Isaiah Stewart
Trendon Watford
Kahlil Whitney
Samuell Williamson
James Wiseman

2020
Source

AWAY
Scottie Barnes
Brandon Boston Jr.
Josh Christopher
Sharife Cooper
Cade Cunningham
R. J. Davis
Hunter Dickinson
Andre Jackson
Isaiah Jackson
Caleb Love
Adam Miller
Day'Ron Sharpe
Jalen Suggs
Isaiah Todd

HOME
Jabri Abdur-Rahim
Devin Askew
Jaemyn Brakefield
Nimari Burnett
Terrence Clarke
Jalen Green
Jalen Johnson
Evan Mobley
Micah Peavy
Jeremy Roach
D. J. Steward
Cameron Thomas
Mark Williams
Ziaire Williams

2021
Source

Patrick Baldwin Jr.
Paolo Banchero
Tamar Bates
Charles Bediako
Nathan Bittle
Malaki Branham
Kendall Brown
Kobe Bufkin
Kennedy Chandler
Max Christie
Daimion Collins
JD Davison
Moussa Diabaté
Michael Foster
AJ Griffin
Jaden Hardy
Nolan Hickman
Chet Holmgren
Bryce Hopkins
Caleb Houstan
Trevor Keels
Langston Love
Bryce McGowens
Aminu Mohammed
Efton Reid
Hunter Sallis
Jabari Smith Jr.
TyTy Washington
Peyton Watson
Benny Williams

2022
Source

AWAY
Amari Bailey
Jaden Bradley
Jalen Hood-Schifino
Jett Howard
Vincent Iwuchukwu
Dior Johnson
Dereck Lively II
Dillon Mitchell
Julian Phillips
Malik Reneau
JJ Starling
Dariq Whitehead
Cam Whitmore

HOME
Adem Bona
Skyy Clark
Kam Craft
Kyle Filipowski
Keyonte George
Chris Livingston
Brandon Miller
Tarris Reed
Ty Rodgers
Nick Smith
Cason Wallace
Jordan Walsh
Kel'el Ware

MVP Awards

References

External links
 Jordan Brand Classic website
 Official website
 List of Alumni

 
Recurring sporting events established in 2002